The UTVA Kobac (English: Sparrowhawk) was a prototype Serbian single-engine, low-wing tandem-seat turboprop training/light attack aircraft manufactured by Pančevo based UTVA Aviation Industry and designed by the Military Technical Institute. Revealed as a mockup on 02 September 2012 during the Batajnica 2012 Air Show, the aircraft's first flight was planned for 2013, but was never realized.

Design Concept
Based on the proven UTVA Lasta 95P-2 tandem two-seat low-wing trainer, the Kobac promised a  maximum speed and was intended to serve the Serbian Airforce and export customers with advanced training in all weather conditions. Equipped with the capability to conduct border patrols and strikes against ground-based targets, the aircraft was touted as a close air support, counterinsurgency, and reconnaissance aircraft similar to the Super Tucano and Texan II.

The Kobac concept envisioned modifications to the Lasta platform to suit advanced new roles.

Two engine options were planned to be offered in the production version of the Kobac. The  Pratt & Whitney Canada PT6A-25C and the Ukrainian built  Ivchenko-Progress Motor Sich AI-450S. To handle the increase in power, the rear fuselage of the Lasta airframe was lengthened and a new rear fin was designed.

All four underwing pylons of the Kobac were intended to carry unguided munitions, tube rocket launchers and gun pods for either a 12.7-mm (0.5-inch) machine gun or  autocannon. The outer wing pylons were intended for mounting air-to-air missiles, air-to-surface missiles or racks for practice bombs; while the centreline hardpoint was designed to carry an electronic warfare pod.

UTVA redesigned the Kobac cockpit with a new canopy offering better visibility than the Lasta-95. A modern three-screen cockpit was installed in the Kobac mockup, with a large central multifunction display for tactical displays and sensor imagery. Control of the system was to be by HOTAS (hands-on throttle and stick) and a navigation and attack system was reportedly devised with sensors mounted in a low-profile pallet under the centre fuselage.

Specifications (Kobac prototype)

Video promotion
  KOBAC - turboprop training aircraft - Al Jazeera Balkans

See also

References

UTVA aircraft
Military Technical Institute Belgrade
Single-engined tractor aircraft
Low-wing aircraft
Single-engined turboprop aircraft
Serbian military trainer aircraft
Experimental aircraft